Son of G Rap is a collaborative album by hip hop artists 38 Spesh and Kool G Rap. The two rappers first worked together in 2014, when they released the DJ Premier-produced cut entitled "The Meeting" (which is also featured on this album). However, they would not finish their entire project until four years later, in 2018.

The project was first announced by 38 Spesh on social media on April 1, 2018. The album had a soft release on July 6, 2018, only being available on websites such as Bandcamp and YouTube and Hip Hop DX. The album was officially released on all streaming services, as well as physical and digital retailers on July 20, 2018.

Son of G Rap features vocals from 38 Spesh on all 15 tracks, with Kool G Rap appearing on 9 of the 15 tracks. The album is considered an homage to the impact Kool G Rap has made on the culture of Hip Hop and a passing of the torch to the younger artist 38 Spesh.

Track listing

References

External links
Digital Stream

2018 albums
Hip hop albums by American artists
Albums produced by DJ Premier
Albums produced by Pete Rock
Albums produced by Showbiz (producer)
Albums produced by Daringer (producer)
Albums produced by the Alchemist (musician)
Kool G Rap albums